Ann Kristin Aarønes (born 19 January 1973) is a Norwegian former footballer. She first played for Spjelkavik IL, then for Trondheims-Ørn and the Norwegian national team. Later she played for the WUSA's New York Power, during the club's first season of play in 2001.

Club career

At club level with Trondheims-Ørn she won six Norwegian Women's Cup competitions and five Toppserien championships between 1993 and 2000.

Aarønes signed for the professional Women's United Soccer Association (WUSA) ahead of the inaugural season in 2001. She was allocated to New York Power alongside compatriot Gro Espeseth. Plagued by lower back and hamstring injuries, she was only able to play for one season before retiring.

International career
In September 1990 Aarønes won her first cap for the Norway women's national football team at Old Trafford in a 0–0 1991 UEFA Women's Championship qualification draw with England.

Aarønes played 111 senior international matches for Norway between 1990 and 1999, scoring 60 goals.  She was the top scorer at the 1995 FIFA Women's World Cup, which was won by Norway. Also with the Norway team she won bronze at the inaugural Olympic women's football tournament at Atlanta 1996. In 1993 she became a European Champion with Norway, having been a runner-up in 1991. Aarønes also played for Norway in Euro 1997 and at the 1999 FIFA Women's World Cup. She was included in the All-star team in 1999, although Norway failed to defend their title.

International goals

References

External links
 
 
 

1973 births
Living people
Norway women's international footballers
Footballers at the 1996 Summer Olympics
Olympic footballers of Norway
Olympic bronze medalists for Norway
Spjelkavik IL players
SK Trondheims-Ørn players
New York Power players
Women's United Soccer Association players
Expatriate women's soccer players in the United States
Sportspeople from Ålesund
Norwegian expatriate sportspeople in the United States
Norwegian expatriate women's footballers
Norwegian women's footballers
FIFA Century Club
Olympic medalists in football
FIFA Women's World Cup-winning players
Medalists at the 1996 Summer Olympics
Women's association football forwards
1995 FIFA Women's World Cup players
UEFA Women's Championship-winning players
1999 FIFA Women's World Cup players